Nevada ( nə--də) is an unincorporated community in Liberty Township, Tipton County, in the U.S. state of Indiana.

It is part of the Kokomo, Indiana Metropolitan Statistical Area.

History
Nevada was first settled by Benjamin Denny. Denny moved to the area from Madison County around 1850. The town was platted by Denny and William Marshall in October, 1852. Sylvester Turpen named the community after "a town in Mexico." A post office was established in 1850, and it was abolished in 1907. The first general store was opened in 1850. The first grist mill and saw mill, which were combined, were opened in 1854.

In 1881, Tom Fox murdered Erastus Nordyke in a wheat field just outside Nevada. Fox was never arrested because he could not be found. His disappearance was described as if he had been "swallowed up in the earth."

Geography

References

Unincorporated communities in Tipton County, Indiana
Unincorporated communities in Indiana
Kokomo, Indiana metropolitan area